The Official Vinyl Albums Chart is a weekly record chart in the United Kingdom. It is compiled by the Official Charts Company (OCC) on behalf of the music industry. It lists the top 40 most popular albums in the vinyl format each week. The chart, along with the corresponding Official Vinyl Singles Chart, was launched on 6 April 2015 to coincide with Record Store Day, and was introduced in response to the major rise in popularity of vinyl records, both songs and albums; 2014 saw 1.3 million vinyl albums sold in the UK for the first time since 1995.

Martin Talbot, chief executive of the Official Charts Company, said: "We're delighted to launch the UK's first Official Vinyl Albums and Official Vinyl Singles charts on OfficialCharts.com, to coincide with Record Store Day this coming weekend. With vinyl album sales up by almost 70% already this year, vinyl junkies could well have snapped up 2 million units by the end of this year – an extraordinary number, if you consider sales were one-tenth of that just six years ago. This growth underlines the continuing resurgence of this much-loved format, whether you're a fan of Arctic Monkeys, Noel Gallagher, Led Zeppelin or David Bowie."

On 12 April 2015, Future Hearts by All Time Low became the first number one on the Official Vinyl Albums Chart.

Best-selling vinyl albums by year

See also
List of Official Vinyl Albums Chart number ones of the 2010s
List of Official Vinyl Albums Chart number ones of the 2020s
List of Official Vinyl Singles Chart number ones of the 2010s
List of Official Vinyl Singles Chart number ones of the 2020s

References

External links
 Official Vinyl Albums Chart Top 40 at the Official Charts Company

British record charts
2015 establishments in the United Kingdom